David Shenk is an American writer, lecturer, and filmmaker. He is author of six books, including The Genius in All of Us (2010), Data Smog (1997), The Forgetting (2001), and The Immortal Game (2006), and has contributed to National Geographic, Slate, The New York Times, Gourmet, Harper's, Wired, The New Yorker, The New Republic, The Nation, The American Scholar, NPR and PBS. In mid-2009, he joined TheAtlantic.com as a correspondent. He is a 1988 graduate of Brown University.

Books 
Shenk has published the following books:
 Skeleton Key: A Dictionary For Deadheads (1994) (Co-written with Steve Silberman)
 Data Smog: Surviving the Information Glut (1997) 
 The End of Patience: More Notes of Caution on the Information Revolution (1999)
 The Forgetting: Alzheimer's, Portrait of An Epidemic (2001)  
 The Immortal Game: A History of Chess (2006)
 The Genius In All Of Us:  Why Everything You've Been Told About Genetics, Talent, and IQ Is Wrong (2010)

Films 
In 2004, PBS broadcast the Emmy award-winning "The Forgetting," which was inspired by Shenk's book of the same name. The film was directed by Elizabeth Arledge. Shenk appeared in the film and served as a writer and consultant. 

In 2006, "The Forgetting" was featured on-screen and read aloud in the Sarah Polley film "Away From Her." Polley said that the book was "hugely influential" to her in making the film.

In 2007, Shenk wrote, produced and directed four short films on Alzheimer's disease.

Awards and honors 
 1995: Fellow, Freedom Forum Media Studies Center at Columbia University   
 1997: Finalist, McGannon Award for Social and Ethical Relevance in Communication Policy 
 1998: Fellow, The Japan Society 
 2000: Named one of "10 Masters of the New Economy" by CIO magazine. 
 2001: The Forgetting awarded First Prize, British Medical Association's Popular Medical Book Awards 
 2001: The Forgetting picked as An Amazon Top Book of 2001 
 2004: Emmy Award for PBS's "The Forgetting"
 2004: Shenk's original term "data smog" added to the Oxford English Dictionary  
 2006: The Immortal Game picked as a Globe and Mail  Top Book of 2006 and Toronto Star Top 100 Book of 2006

References

External links 
 Shenk's homepage with links to some of this talks.
 Shenk's blog at The Atlantic
 A Quick Look At Alzheimer's: Four Pocket Films to Increase Understanding of a 21st Century Epidemic
 PBS's "The Forgetting"
 ABC News: David Shenk Answers Your Questions About Alzheimer's Disease
 Commonwealth Club talk of March 18th 2010 by David Shenk on his book "The Genius in All of Us". A 40-minute talk followed by 20 minutes of questions.

American filmmakers
Living people
Year of birth missing (living people)
Brown University alumni
American male writers